The Burney Cup (Ulster Schoolboys' Senior Hockey Cup) is an annual competition involving the strongest schools affiliated to the Ulster Branch of the Irish Hockey Association. The competition is held in the spring term of each school year and progress through to the final is via an open draw.

The most successful school is Friends' School Lisburn with 20 wins (16 outright wins and 4 shared wins).

The current holder is Banbridge Academy.

Eligibility

To play in the competition, boys must be 19 years of age and under on 1 April immediately preceding the draw. The draw for the Cup takes places in early January. A fresh draw to determine pairings is held prior to each subsequent round.

History

The trophy was presented by Andrew George Burney of East Antrim Hockey Club.

The first final took place on 22 April 1920 at the Ormeau Road grounds of North of Ireland Rugby & Cricket Club. The final was marked by future Irish rugby union and cricket international A.C. Douglas of Royal Belfast Academical Institution scoring all six goals in his team's victory.

Performance table

(one finalist missing)

Finals

(records incomplete)

1920s

1930s

1940s

1950s

1960s

1970s

1980s

1990s

2000s

2010s

2020s

Footnote

 a Ballyclare Intermediate School would later be renamed as Ballyclare High School.
 b Lisburn Intermediate School would later be renamed as Wallace High School.
 c Newry Intermediate School would later be renamed as Newry Grammar School(1948) and then Newry High School(1966).

Sources

External links
 Ulster Branch of Irish Hockey Union

Field hockey competitions in Ulster
1920 establishments in Ireland
Field hockey cup competitions in Ireland